Quezon City's 4th congressional district is one of the six congressional districts of the Philippines in Quezon City. It has been represented in the House of Representatives of the Philippines since 1987. The district consists of the south central barangays bordering Manila and San Juan. It includes the Diliman and New Manila areas Quezon Avenue borders it to the north and EDSA to the east. It is currently represented in the 19th Congress by Marvin Rillo of the Lakas-CMD.

Two-time Speaker Feliciano Belmonte Jr. hailed from this district.

Representation history

Election results

2010

2013

2016

2019

2022

See also
Legislative districts of Quezon City

References

Congressional districts of the Philippines
Politics of Quezon City
1987 establishments in the Philippines
Congressional districts of Metro Manila
Constituencies established in 1987